The Gardener is a 1987 Soviet drama film directed by Viktor Buturlin.

Plot 
The film tells the story of a man who grew an apple orchard.

Cast 
 Oleg Borisov
 Lev Borisov
 Evgenia Smolyaninova
 Konstantin Yukhov
 Varvara Shabalina
 Irina Rakshina		
 Vadim Lobanov
 Nina Usatova
 Viktor Bychkov
 Pyotr Drotskoy

References

External links 
 

1987 films
1980s Russian-language films
Soviet drama films
1987 drama films